Lynn Nicholas Libett (born December 9, 1945) is a Canadian retired ice hockey player.  He played 12 years in the National Hockey League as a left winger for the Detroit Red Wings (1967–79) and Pittsburgh Penguins (1979–1981). In 982 career games, he scored 504 points, and was captain of the Red Wings on two occasions during the 1970s.

Career
Libett was born in 1945 at Stratford, Ontario. He played youth hockey with the Stratford Pee Wees and the Stratford Junior Braves.

Professional hockey
Libett played junior hockey with the Hamilton Red Wings from 1962 to 1966, and began his professional hockey career with the Memphis Wings (1965–67) and Fort Worth Wings (1967-68).

Libett made his NHL debut with the Detroit Red Wings during the 1967-68 season.  He was a starter at left wing for Detroit for 11 consecutive seasons from 1968-69 through the 1978-79 season.  He led the NHL in games played four times, scored at least 20 goals six times, averaged over 50 points a season from 1971 to 1975, represented Detroit in the 1977 NHL All-Star Game, and finished seventh in the voting for the Frank J. Selke Trophy during the 1978-79 season.  He played in the playoffs only twice in his twelve seasons with the Red Wings.

On August 3, 1979, Libett was traded by the Red Wings to the Pittsburgh Penguins in exchange for Pete Mahovlich.  He played two season with the Penguins, retiring after the 1980-81 season at age 35.

Family and later years
After retiring from hockey, Libett continued to live in metropolitan Detroit, working for Decoma, an automotive supplier and subsidiary of Magna International. He survived non-Hodgkins lymphoma in the late 1980s.

Libett and his wife, Jacqueline B. Libett, had three children: Stephanie, Christopher and Kathleen. Jacqueline died in 2019; they had been married for 53 years.

Career statistics

Regular season and playoffs

International

References

External links
 

1945 births
Living people
Canadian ice hockey left wingers
Cincinnati Wings players
Detroit Red Wings captains
Detroit Red Wings players
Fort Worth Wings players
Hamilton Red Wings (OHA) players
Ice hockey people from Ontario
Memphis Wings players
San Diego Gulls (WHL) players
Sportspeople from Stratford, Ontario
Pittsburgh Penguins players